This article lists the events, album releases, and album release dates in hip hop music for the year 2017.

Events

January
On January 8, Drake's Summer Sixteen Tour was declared the highest grossing hip-hop concert tour in history with a gross of $84,300,000 from a total of 54 different shows. The previous record holder was Jay-Z and Kanye West's Watch the Throne Tour, which made a total of $75,000,000 from 63 live shows.
On January 9, West Coast record producer and DJ Crazy Toones died at the age of 45 from a heart attack.
On January 18, 21 Savage announced that he had signed a deal with Epic Records. The same day that Fat Joe announced that he had signed a management deal with Jay Z's Roc Nation company.
On January 19, XXXTentacion's court date for his October 2016 arrest was pushed back to April 1.

February
On February 7, Jim Jones announced that he signed a management deal with Jay Z's Roc Nation company, ending their long-standing feud.
On February 10, Gucci Mane announced that Ralo was the first artist to sign to his latest imprint of 1017 Records.
On February 13, Philadelphia rapper E-Dubble died from a blood infection.
On February 16, Canadian rapper Nav announced that he had signed to The Weeknd's label XO Records.
On February 20, Atlanta-based rapper J.I.D announced that he had signed to J. Cole's record label, Dreamville Records.
On February 24, Nicki Minaj's lyrics on the songs "Make Love" and "Swalla" ignited a feud between herself and Remy Ma. The following day, Remy Ma released the song "ShETHER" in response.
On February 28, Kodak Black was arrested for probation violation. The same day Vic Mensa was arrested in Beverly Hills and charged with carrying a concealed weapon. He was later released on a $35,000 bail.

March 
 On March 3, Shady Records announced that it had signed a deal with Griselda Records for artists Westside Gunn and Conway.
On March 5, Lud Foe was involved in a life-threatening car accident with an 18-wheeler that left him a broken jaw, two broken wrists, and several fractures and wounds.
On March 7, PUMA announced that Big Sean had signed a deal to launch a line of clothing with the company under the title of "Creative Collaborator and Global Brand Ambassador".
On March 15, Meek Mill was charged with misdemeanor assault after being involved in an altercation with two employees at St. Louis International Airport. He was later given a court summons.
On March 20, Nicki Minaj surpassed Aretha Franklin for the most entries on the Billboard Hot 100 of any female artist with 76 different entries on the chart. 
On March 29, both XXXTentacion and Lil Twist were released from prison.

April
On April 1, Big Sean was awarded the key to the city of Detroit for his work with his own charity, the Sean Anderson Foundation. He is the youngest person in history to receive the award. Other holders of the key to the city of Detroit include former Iraqi President Saddam Hussein and Stevie Wonder.
On April 4, Kanye West's The Life of Pablo became the first streaming-only album to be certified platinum by the Recording Industry of America (RIAA), with it being streamed over 3,000,000,000 times worldwide.
On April 12, Birdman revealed on picture-sharing social network Instagram that he had accepted a plaque in honor of his record label Cash Money Records, selling 1,000,000,000 units.

June
On June 13, XXL released their tenth annual Freshman Class, including A Boogie wit da Hoodie, PnB Rock, Playboi Carti, Ugly God, Kyle, Aminé, MadeinTYO, Kamaiyah, Kap G, and XXXTentacion.
On June 15, 40 Glocc was shot twice while attending a funeral in San Bernardino, California.
On June 20, Prodigy died in Las Vegas, Nevada, with no official cause of death known. Initially, it was presumed his death was from sickle-cell anemia; which he had suffered from his entire life. However, it was revealed in August that he died from accidental choking at a hospital in Las Vegas.

July
On July 17, Forbes reported that hip-hop/R&B (which Nielsen SoundScan classifies as the same genre) had recently usurped rock as the most consumed musical genre, becoming the most popular genre in music for the first time in U.S. history.

September
On September 3, Lil Wayne was hospitalized in Chicago for suffering multiple seizures.
On September 10, Rapper "Da Real Gee Money" was shot and killed in Baton Rouge.
On September 27, Young Dolph was ambushed during a gunfight in Hollywood. He was rushed to the hospital after gunshot wounds were discovered.
On September 29, Rapper "Rittz" released his last album on the Strange Music Label "Last Call". Often considered one of the most underrated albums released in the last 5–6 years.

October
On October 27, XXXTentacion announced on Instagram that he would be retiring from the music industry due to negativity and backlash.
On October 30, Remy Ma signed a deal with Columbia Records.

November
On November 5, Meek Mill was sentenced to 2–4 years of prison for violating probation on a 10-year drug and weapon case.
On November 15, Lil Peep was pronounced dead due to an overdose, moments before he was supposed to perform at a show in Tucson. It was reported to be a mixture of Xanax laced with fentanyl.
On November 27, Nipsey Hussle signed a multi-album deal with Atlantic Records.

December 
 On December 3, Quelle Chris and Jean Grae got engaged.

Released albums

January

February

March

April

May

June

July

August

September

October

November

December

Highest-charting singles

Highest first-week consumption

All critically reviewed albums ranked

Metacritic

AnyDecentMusic?

See also
Previous article: 2016 in hip hop music
Next article: 2018 in hip hop music

References

Hip hop music by year
2010s in hip hop music
Hip hop